Església de Sant Miquel de Fontaneda  is a church located in Fontaneda, Sant Julià de Lòria Parish, Andorra. It is a heritage property registered in the Cultural Heritage of Andorra. It was built in the 11-12th century.

References

Sant Julià de Lòria
Roman Catholic churches in Andorra
Cultural Heritage of Andorra